Edward Brabazon may refer to:

 Edward Brabazon, 1st Baron Ardee (1548–1625), Anglo-Irish peer
 Edward Brabazon, 7th Earl of Meath (1691–1772), Anglo-Irish peer